Minuscule 410 (in the Gregory-Aland numbering), ε 318 (in Soden's numbering), is a Greek minuscule manuscript of the New Testament, on cotton paper. Palaeographically it has been assigned to the 13th century. The marginal apparatus is full. The manuscript was prepared for the Church reading.

Description 

The codex contains a complete text of the four Gospels on 213 paper leaves. The text is written in one column per page, in 28 lines per page.

There is also another division according to the smaller Ammonian Sections, whose numbers are given at the margin, but without references to the Eusebian Canons.

The Epistula ad Carpianum, the Eusebian tables (on parchment), Prolegomena to the four Gospels, and Prolegomena to Matthew on parchment, possibly from the 13th century.

Text 

The Greek text of the codex is a representative of the Byzantine text-type. Hermann von Soden classified it to the textual family Kx. Aland placed it in Category V.
According to the Claremont Profile Method it represents textual cluster M349 in Luke 1, Luke 10, and Luke 20.

History 

The manuscript was dated to the 13th or 14th century. Currently it is dated by the INTF to the 13th century.

The manuscript was written by Joasaph, a monk. Wiedmann and J. G. J. Braun collated portions of the manuscript for Scholz (1794-1852). The manuscript was added to the list of New Testament manuscripts by Scholz.
C. R. Gregory saw it in 1886.

The manuscript is currently housed at the Biblioteca Marciana (Gr. I. 17) in Venice.

See also 

 List of New Testament minuscules
 Biblical manuscript
 Textual criticism

References

Further reading 

 

Greek New Testament minuscules
13th-century biblical manuscripts